

Karl Jakob Heinrich Brenner - also Karl-Heinrich Brenner - (1 May 1895 – 14 February 1954) was a decorated German general of the Waffen-SS who held the rank of SS-Gruppenführer and Generalleutnant of Polizei during the Nazi era. He was a recipient of the Knight's Cross of the Iron Cross of Nazi Germany.

Awards
 Knight's Cross of the Iron Cross on 27 December 1944 as SS-Gruppenführer and Generalleutnant of the Police.
 Clasp to the Iron Cross 2nd Class (4 August 1941) & 1st Class (17 August 1941)
 Wound Badge 1939 in Gold (27 September 1941)
 Infantry Assault Badge in Silver (16 May 1944)
 War Merit Cross 2nd Class with Swords (24 July 1940) & 1st Class with Swords (1 September 1942)

See also
List SS-Gruppenführer

References

Citations

Bibliography

 
 

1895 births
1954 deaths
Military personnel from Mannheim
20th-century Freikorps personnel
German Army personnel of World War I
Prussian Army personnel
Recipients of the Knight's Cross of the Iron Cross
Recipients of the clasp to the Iron Cross, 1st class
Recipients of the Gold German Cross
People from the Grand Duchy of Baden
Waffen-SS personnel
SS-Gruppenführer
Police of Nazi Germany